Ølstykke station is a station on the Frederikssund radial of the S-train network of Copenhagen, Denmark.

The station is located where the railway to Frederikssund crosses the main road between Roskilde and Hillerød. This puts it quite a distance away from the old village of Ølstykke, but a new station town grew up around the station after the railway opened in 1879. Since 2002, the area around the old village has been served by a station of its own, Gammel Toftegård. Gammel Toftegård station later changed name to Egedal station.

Vinge station 3.3 km (2 miles) northwest of Ølstykke station opened 14 December 2020. It is served by the C line.

Services

References

S-train (Copenhagen) stations
Railway stations opened in 1879
Railway stations in Denmark opened in the 19th century